Kwara Central Senatorial District covering mainly the city of Ilorin is a metropolitan senatorial district of all the three in Kwara State. Kwara Central Senatorial Districts covers four local governments which include Asa, Ilorin East, Ilorin South and  Ilorin West. Bukola Saraki, the President of the 8th National Assembly is from this district. The current representative of Kwara Central Senatorial District is Ibrahim Oloriegbe of the All Progressives Congress, APC.

List of senators representing Kwara Central

References 

Kwara State
Senatorial districts in Nigeria